The Seth Boyden Terrace, named after Seth Boyden, was a former public housing complex in the South Ward of Newark, New Jersey.

The project, one of the city of Newark's first attempts at providing public housing, opened in 1941. The three-story buildings located at Frelinghuysen Avenue, Center Terrace, Dayton Street, and Seth Boyden Terrace contain 530 apartments.

In 1942, the 530 families who lived in the project, along with their 1000 children, were put under quarantine when three children were stricken with paralysis.

There is currently Seth Boyden Elderly housing still in use through the Newark Housing Authority. , the Seth Boyden Terrace housing project in Newark was abandoned. It was demolished in 2022.

In 2022 it was announced the site of the housing project would be turned into television and film studios, soundstages, and Foley rooms as part of Lionsgate Newark studios.

References

Public housing in the United States
Apartment buildings in Newark, New Jersey
1941 establishments in New Jersey
Residential buildings completed in 1941